Route 171 is a short highway in western Missouri.  Its northern terminus is at the Kansas state line where it continues as K-171 near Opolis, Kansas.  Its southern terminus is at the junction of Interstate 49/U.S. Route 71, Route 96 and Route 571 in Carthage.  The last ten southbound miles are concurrent with Business I-49.

Route description
Some (about half) of those last  to Carthage, from its junction with I-49 Business at Madison Ave. in Webb City, are routed in a northeasterly direction. This results in going northeast on southbound Route 171 and vice versa along this stretch. However, I-49 Business is going more or less in its designated direction, north, in a wrong-way concurrency at the same time.

Also, because of this curve back to the northeast, Route 171 and Route 96 intersect each other on opposite sides of the Joplin/Webb City area. Going "southbound," Route 96 and Route 171 meet each other about two miles (3 km) north of Carl Junction and then again about two miles (3 km) west of Carthage. Route 96 maintains a straight east–west routing between these two points except at the very east end before the intersection with Route 171 and I-49 Business.

At Carthage, Route 171 meets its "parent" route, US 71, along with I-49.  Route 171's "southern" terminus and I-49 Business' northern terminus are here while the northern terminus of Route 571 approaches from the east. Route 96 continues through this interchange. This results in three x71's meeting in the same location.

History
Route 171 was once Route 57. That was changed when I-57 was established on the eastern side of the state. Kansas did not change K-57's number to match until 2004, when it became K-171 after it was decided to shorten K-57 because it had numerous concurrencies along its routing.

Major intersections

References

171
Transportation in Jasper County, Missouri